Gallipolis Island is an island on the Ohio River along the bank at Gallipolis, Ohio and across from Mason County, West Virginia, USA.

Although located within the boundaries of West Virginia, Gallipolis Island historically belonged to the city of Gallipolis, Ohio until the city and a private landowner, Michael Hoeft, from Milton, W.Va., donated their ownership shares of the island in 2016 to the West Virginia Land Trust.

The land trust protects the island as essential habitat for fish, mussels, birds and other animals, as well as for public recreation.

The West Virginia Land Trust intends to stabilize stream banks to keep it from eroding—the island was once more than 85 acres, but erosion reduced its size over the years to just a few acres.

Once the West Virginia Land Trust completes its restoration, after 10 years, the island's ownership will be transferred to the United States Department of Fish and Wildlife Service for its inclusion in the Ohio River Islands National Wildlife Refuge, a collection of 22 protected islands along the 362-mile stretch of the Ohio River from Pennsylvania to Kentucky.

According to information collected from Gallia County Historical Society Director Mary Lee Marchi, when the original French 500 found Gallipolis Island in 1770, they discovered wild grapes. Those grapes were then used to produce a local wine that may have been one of the town's first exported products, along with bootleg rum and whiskey.

In the 1840s, the island was turned into a kind of resort with beach access, a picnic area and a playground. In the 1860s, steamboats were made on the island.

Read a West Virginia Land trust article about Gallipolis Island.

See also 
List of islands of West Virginia

References

River islands of West Virginia
Landforms of Mason County, West Virginia
Islands of the Ohio River